Hans Söhnker (11 October 1903 – 20 April 1981) was a German film actor. He appeared in more than 100 films between 1933 and 1980. He was born in Kiel, Germany and died in Berlin, Germany.

Selected filmography

 The Tsarevich (1933) – Der Zarewitsch
 The Black Forest Girl (1933) – Hans Fichtner, Student
 Annette im Paradies (1934) – Hans Siebert
 The Big Chance (1934) – Thomas Menzel
 Ich sing' mich in dein Herz hinein (1934) – Hans, sein Sohn
 The Csardas Princess (1934) – Prinz Edwin Weylersheim
 Jede Frau hat ein Geheimnis (1934) – Hans Jürgens
 She and the Three (1935) – Rudolf Rostorff, Zimmerkellner
  (1935) – Georg von Hochheim
 Rêve d'Amour (1935) – Leutnant Baron Koloman von Eötvös
 The Young Count (1935) – Hans Flint
 Herbstmanöver (1936) – Viktor von Randau
 Faithful (1936) – Carl Koster
 Arzt aus Leidenschaft (1936) – Dr. Wüstefeld
 Where the Lark Sings (1936) – Hans Berend
 The Three Around Christine (1936) – Eggert
 Dinner Is Served (1936) – Robert Spiller
  (1937) – Dr.-Ing. Heinz Fritsch
 Truxa (1937) – Chef einer Tanzgrippe
 Patricia Gets Her Man (1937) – Count Stephan d'Orlet
 The Model Husband (1937) – Jack Wheeler
 The Irresistible Man (1937) – André Vallier
  (1937) – Kammersänger Hans Weigel / Eisenstein
 Musik für dich (1937) – Peter
 The Woman at the Crossroads (1938) – Fred Moebius
 Der Tag nach der Scheidung (1938) – Julian Bork, Sportflieger
 The Four Companions (1938) – Stefan Kohlund
  (1938) – Hans Promm
  (1938) – Ruda, Dompteur
 Mistake of the Heart (1939) – Flugkapitän van Santen
 Gold in New Frisco (1939) – Frank Norton
 Men Are That Way (1939)
  (1939) – Nick Dorland
 Nanette (1940) – Alexander Patou
 Woman Made to Measure (1940) – Christian Bauer
 Blutsbrüderschaft (1941) – Oberleutnant Klaus Olden
 Goodbye, Franziska (1941) – Michael Reisiger
 Wenn du noch eine Heimat hast (1942) – Heinrich Doorn
 The Big Game (1942) – Zuschauer
 Fronttheater (1942) – Selbst / Himself (unconfirmed, uncredited)
 My Wife Theresa (1942) – Peter Dühren
 Nacht ohne Abschied (1943) – Rittmeister Gunnar Nyborg
 Love Premiere (1943) – Komponist Axel Berndt
 A Man With Principles? (1943) – Dr. Hans Winhold
  (1944) – Hans Gustav (Achim) Strengholt
 Große Freiheit Nr. 7 (1944) – Willem
 Film ohne Titel (1948) – Martin Delius
 Hallo, Fräulein! (1949) – Walter Reinhardt
 Einmaleins der Ehe (1949) – Peter Norden
 Beloved Liar (1950) – Rudolf Siebert
 Only One Night (1950) – Der Mann
 The Rabanser Case (1950) – Peter Rabanser
 Love and Blood (1951) – Marco, capo camorra
 Shadows Over Naples (1951) – Marco, capo Camorra
 White Shadows (1951) – Richard
 My Friend the Thief (1951) – Percy
 Queen of the Arena (1952) – Professor Gerhart Mahnke, Bildhauer
 The Singing Hotel (1953) – Hans
 The Stronger Woman (1953) – Jochen Faber
 Must We Get Divorced? (1953) – Dr. Algys
 A Life for Do (1954) – Thomas
 Men at a Dangerous Age (1954) – Franz Volker
 Hoheit lassen bitten (1954) – Graf Rosen-Bückburg
 The Great Test (1954) – Dr. Clausen
 Doctor Solm (1955) – Oberarzt Dr. Karl Solm
 One Woman Is Not Enough? (1955) – Ernst Vossberg
 Before God and Man (1955) – Georg
  (1956) – Professor Mathias
 Holiday in Tyrol (1956) – Robert von Stetten
 If We All Were Angels (1956) – Enrico Farlotti
 Beloved Corinna (1956) – Peter Mansfeld
 Wie schön, daß es dich gibt (1957) – Theo Henning
  (1957) – Alfred Roscher
  (1957) – Wolfgang Cornelius – Gymnasialdirektor
  (1958) – Erik Kramer
 Worüber man nicht spricht – Frauenarzt Dr. Brand greift ein (1958) – Professor Dr. Brand
 For the First Time (1959) – Prof. Bruckner
 Jacqueline (1959) – Zander, Theaterdirektor
 I'm Marrying the Director (1960) – Direktor Georg Stahlmann
 Brainwashed (1960) – Bishop Ambrosse
 Carnival Confession (1960) – Panezza
 Wegen Verführung Minderjähriger (1960) – Dr. Stefan Rugge, Studienrat
 I Will Always Be Yours (1960) – Heinrich Horstmann
 Our House in Cameroon (1961) – Willem Ambrock
 The Longest Day (1962) – Pemsel's Officer (uncredited)
 Sherlock Holmes and the Deadly Necklace (1962) – Prof. Moriarty
 Dulcinea (1963)
 The Phantom of Soho (1964) – Sir Phillip
 The World Revolves Around You (1964) – Richard Fischer, Martins Vater
 The Hound of Blackwood Castle (1968) – Anwalt Robert Jackson
 Salto Mortale (1969, TV series) – Direktor Kogler
 (1970, TV film) – Sam Kinsale

References

External links

Hans Söhnker at Virtual History

1903 births
1981 deaths
20th-century German male actors
German male film actors
German male television actors
Officers Crosses of the Order of Merit of the Federal Republic of Germany